TV Rock were an Australian dance music duo consisting of Grant Smillie and Ivan Gough.

Biography
TV Rock entered the mainstream in February 2006 with their hit "Flaunt It" featuring Seany B which reached #1 for five weeks, spent 39 weeks in the Australian ARIA Top 50 (including 31 weeks inside the Top 40), and won the 2006 ARIA Music Award for highest-selling single and best dance release.

TV Rock collaborated with Melbourne dance team Dukes of Windsor for their third single release "The Others" which reached No.10 in Australia in June 2007 and spent 20 weeks inside the Australian Top 50.

Their debut album, Sunshine City, was released on 25 November 2006.

The duo founded a dance record label, Neon Records, which manages fellow Melburnian DJs Dirty South & Denzal Park and singer Zoe Badwi.

In early 2013, Gough left TV Rock to pursue solo projects.

Discography

Album

Singles

Awards and nominations

ARPA Awards
The APRA Awards have been presented annually since 1982 by the Australasian Performing Right Association (APRA).

|-
|rowspan="2"| 2007 ||rowspan="2"| "Flaunt It" (Sean Berchik, Ivan Gough, Grant Smillie) – TV Rock featuring Seany B || Most Performed Dance Work || 
|-
| Most Performed Australian Work || 
|-
| 2008 || "The Others" (Cory Blight, Scott Targett, Jack Weaving) – TV Rock vs the Dukes of Windsor || Dance Work of the Year ||

ARIA Music Awards
The ARIA Music Awards is an annual awards ceremony that recognises excellence, innovation, and achievement across all genres of Australian music..

|-
|rowspan="3"| 2006 ||rowspan="3"| "Flaunt It" (with Seany B)|| ARIA Award for Best Dance Release || 
|-
| ARIA Award for Highest Selling Single || 
|-
| ARIA Award for Breakthrough Artist - Single || 
|-
| 2007 || "The Others" (with Dukes of Winsor)|| ARIA Award for Best Dance Release || 
|-

References

APRA Award winners
Australian electronic musicians
Electronic music duos
ARIA Award winners
Australian electronic dance music groups
Australian house music groups
Australian house musicians
Australian musical duos